= Tafilah, Yemen =

Coordinates: 15°15′N 48°20′E

- Interactive map of Tafilah, Yemen
- Country: Yemen
- Governorate: Hadhramaut
- Time zone: UTC+3 (Yemen Standard Time)

Tafilah, Yemen is a village in eastern Yemen. It is located in the Hadhramaut Governorate.
